Peter Kidson (23 August 1925 – 10 February 2019) was a British Emeritus Professor and Honorary Fellow at the Courtauld Institute of Art where he lectured on Medieval Architecture until 1990. In his obituary in The Telegraph, he was described as “the most influential historian of medieval architecture of his generation in the English-speaking world”.

Education 
Kidson spent 1943 to 1946 on a scholarship to the University of Cambridge (interrupted by WW2 when he was conscripted into the Royal Navy). He graduated in 1950 with a BA. From 1950 to 1959 he studied at the Courtauld (MA & PhD) alongside Brian Sewell. Their tutors at the Courtauld included Anthony Blunt on whom Kidson wrote a memoir for The British Academy in 2016.

Career 
Kidson taught at the Courtauld, also as a visiting lecturer at Cambridge and the University of East Anglia, and as a visiting professor at the University of Victoria, British Columbia in 1972. He was appointed full lecturer at the Courtauld in 1967 where he remained until his retirement as Professor of Medieval Architecture in 1990.

Honours 
1961 – Elected Fellow of the Society of Antiquaries of London
1977 – Appointed Royal Commissioner
1985–1987 – Chairman of the Royal Commission’s Architectural Committee
1982 – Rhind Lecturer of the Society of Antiquaries of Scotland, and member of the British Academy Committee for postgraduate awards in the humanities
1988 – awarded a personal Chair by London University

Upon retirement he became Emeritus Professor and Honorary Fellow of the Courtauld Institute of Art.

Writings 
Sculpture at Chartres, 1958, with photography by Ursula Pariser, published by Alec Tiranti.
A History of English Architecture. Part I, 1962, George G. Harrap. 
A History of English Architecture, 1965, revised edition (with Peter Murray, and Paul Thompson), Penguin Books.
The Medieval World, 1967, Paul Hamlyn.
Salisbury Cathedral: Perspectives On The Architectural History, with Thomas Cocke, 1993,  HMSO.
Courtauld Institute Illustration Archives: Archive 1: Cathedrals & Monastic Buildings In The British Isles: Part 3 Lincoln: St Hugh's Choir & Transepts, 1977, Harvey Miller.

Books on Peter Kidson 
Medieval architecture and its intellectual context: Studies in honour of Peter Kidson, 1990, edd. Eric Fernie and Paul Crossley, Hambledon.

Citations in academic writings 
Geometrical Objects: Architecture and the Mathematical Sciences 1400–1800, 2014, ed. A. Gerbino, Springer.

Contributions 
Photographs contributed by Peter Kidson to the Conway Library are currently (2020) being digitised by the Courtauld Institute of Art, as part of the Courtauld Connects project.

External links 
Kidson wrote the British Academy obituary and biography for fellow art historian Anthony Blunt, Biographical Memoirs of Fellows of the British Academy, XIII, 19–39.

References 

British architectural historians
1925 births
2019 deaths
Alumni of the University of Cambridge
Alumni of the Courtauld Institute of Art
Academics of the Courtauld Institute of Art
Academics of the University of East Anglia
Academic staff of the University of Victoria